A statue of Mickey Mantle is installed in Commerce, Oklahoma, United States, beyond the center field fence of the baseball field at Commerce High School.

See also
 Statue of Mickey Mantle (Oklahoma City)

References

Monuments and memorials in Oklahoma
Outdoor sculptures in Oklahoma
Sculptures of men in Oklahoma
Statues in Oklahoma
Statues of sportspeople
Cultural depictions of baseball players
Cultural depictions of American men